Come On Up is the seventh studio album by American keyboardist Brian Culbertson. It was released by June 13, 2003 on Warner Records. Artists such as Rick Braun, Rashaan Patterson, Marcus Miller and Norman Brown appeared on the album. Come On Up reached number three on both the US Billboard Contemporary Jazz Albums chart and the Billboard Top Jazz Albums chart.

Tracklisting

Charts

References

2003 albums
Warner Records albums